Centennial Park is an urban park in Sydney, New South Wales, Australia. The park is in the City of Randwick local government area and part of the Centennial Parklands area.

The park was inscribed on the Australian National Heritage List on 3 October 2018. The site was listed for its "outstanding heritage value to the nation as the site chosen for the 1901 inauguration of the Commonwealth of Australia".

Centennial Park is home to a number of wild animals including a birds, possums, rabbits and foxes. It is also the location of a number of equestrian schools. 

The park is open from 6:30am to 5:30pm during the winter months, 6am to 6pm in spring and 6am to 8pm in summer.

Cinema 

Outdoor film exhibitor, Moonlight Cinema, holds a licence to operate an outdoor cinema experience within the park; offering hot food, beverages, film festivals, and many other activities during summer months annually.

See also
 Parks in Sydney

References

External links

Parks in Sydney
Australian National Heritage List
1816 establishments in Australia
Parks established in 1816
City of Randwick